David Grimaldi (born March 26, 1978) is an American businessman and current CEO of Elmark. He is the former Chief Administrative Officer of New Castle County government. He previously served as Managing Director at Minmetals,  President of Firestone Hotel Group, and Chief Financial Officer of the Police Athletic League of Delaware. He began his career as a Financial Advisor at Morgan Stanley in New York City where he was ranked number one in his national peer group.

in 2015, Grimaldi was named Delaware's Top 40 Under 40 by the Delaware Business Times.

Government and politics
As Chief Administrative Officer of New Castle County, Grimaldi managed the day-to-day operations of Delaware's largest municipal government and supervised a workforce of 2000 employees with a $250 million annual operating and $1 billion long term capital budget. Under his supervision, New Castle County experienced a huge financial turnaround, which ended a near decade of annual deficits and produced the only two years of back-to-back surplus during that time. Deficit spending resumed after his departure from New Castle County.

Grimaldi was the architect of the New Castle County's economic development strategies, which included the first-ever comprehensive economic development plan and a deal, with former NYSE CEO Richard Grasso and Former UBS CEO Joseph J. Grano Jr., to open a venture stock exchange in Wilmington. The deal began to unraveled as the two Wall St CEO's pulled out following Grimaldi's exit from New Castle County.

As Campaign Manager for Tom Gordon 2012,  Grimaldi managed an upset victory campaign which led to the historic political comeback of Thomas P Gordon. Gordon, whose political career ended with a highly publicized 2002 federal corruption indictment, attempted a 2008 comeback but lost to then New Castle County Executive Chris Coons by a near two-to-one margin. In 2012, Gordon again attempted a comeback and challenged then County Executive Paul Clark. Gordon would go on to defeat Clark, the democratic party endorsed incumbent in the 2012 democratic primary election.  Gordon credited Grimaldi with his upset victory.

Early career
Grimaldi began his career as a Financial Advisor with Morgan Stanley in New York. He became the #1 ranked Advisor within his national peer group at the firm, in all three metrics used to evaluate performance.  He managed nearly $100 million of assets by the time he attained the age of 30. He was twice inducted into Morgan Stanley’s prestigious recognition clubs and served as an advisory board member of Morgan Stanleys Children's Hospital in New York, where he organized a quarterly Scholastic Book Fair along with in-costume readings of children stories to the patients, most of whom were terminally ill children.

Grimaldi went on to serve as Managing Director of Fortune 500 metals and mining giant Minmetals, where he oversaw the US Real Estate Investment Group. He was the President of Firestone Hotel Group which managed the turnaround and transformation of the former Holiday Inn Wilmington to the Crowne Plaza Wilmington North.

Grimaldi served as Treasurer and Chief Financial Officer of the Police Athletic League of Delaware, where he worked closely with Former PAL Chairman Thomas P Gordon in staging the most drastic financial turnaround in the organizations history.
 
Entering the political arena in 2012, David Grimaldi served as Campaign Manager for Tom Gordon 2012, a campaign which unseated the Democratic Party endorsed incumbent in the Democratic primary election and set the stage for the general election victory which followed in November.

Grimaldi holds a BA in Finance from California State University Fullerton.

References

External links
 nccde.org

1978 births
Living people
American chief financial officers
Businesspeople from Queens, New York
People from Queens, New York
California State University, Fullerton alumni